Matrona  (Filipino for "matron") is a story arc of the Philippine comic strip series Pugad Baboy, created by Pol Medina Jr. and originally published in the Philippine Daily Inquirer. This particular story arc lasts 23 strips long. In 1998, the story arc was reprinted in Pugad Baboy X, the tenth book compilation of the comic strip series.

Synopsis
Bab takes Tiny on a date to the Soft Jazz Café. There, an elderly woman dressed in a revealing outfit asks Bab for a light and later, when Tiny goes off to the ladies' room, makes a pass at him. Bab later gets the scare of his life when he discovers that the woman, named "Girlie", is his mother's friend who had just come home from Canada and was staying over at their place.

Cecille, Bab's mom, later relates the reason why Girlie had come home; she was looking for a way to have her marriage in Canada annulled due to her husband's impotence. Bab helps out by introducing Girlie to Attorney Adriano. Girlie, however, soon acquires a distasteful reputation among the men of Pugad Baboy, as even Dagul was not safe from her wiles. Girlie soon confesses to Cecille that menopause was one of the reasons for her behavior. She was afraid of being old and unwanted. Cecille counsels her; telling her that she was experiencing a new phase in life. 

Cecille's advise seemed to work wonders on Girlie; she soon ditched her flirtatious image and began wearing clothes appropriate for her mature age. As she takes her leave for a trip back to Canada, she even lectures Tomas on showing respect when speaking to older persons, suddenly speaking in Tagalog (she spoke in English the whole time she had her flirtatious image).

Trivia
Although the word "matron" has a positive connotation in the Western cultures, the same may not be said for matrona, which Filipinos sometimes use to describe a mature, affluent woman with questionable sexual morals.
Matrona also has the alternate meaning of "midwife".
This is Attorney Adriano's second appearance in a story arc; his first was in Col. Manyakis.
Impotence is sufficient ground for annulment, although Attorney Adriano disagrees with this.
When Girlie confides in Bab that she hated sleeping alone, Bab tells her that he would send "Dongski" to sleep with her. Dongski turns out to be Bab's pet Tamagotchi.
The Soft Jazz Café may be an oblique reference to the Hard Rock Café.

Pugad Baboy